Velanidia is a village and a community of the Voio municipality. Before the 2011 local government reform it was part of the municipality of Neapoli, of which it was a municipal district. The 2011 census recorded 79 inhabitants in the village and 109 inhabitants in the community of Velanidia.

Administrative division
The community of Vronti consists of two separate settlements: 
Sterna (population 30)
Velanidia (population 79)
The aforementioned population figures are as of 2011.

See also
List of settlements in the Kozani regional unit

References

Populated places in Kozani (regional unit)